David G. Bress (1908–1976) was an American lawyer who served as United States Attorney for the District of Columbia from 1965 to 1969. He was nominated by President Johnson for a seat on the United States District Court for the District of Columbia, but the Senate never voted on his nomination.

Bress later served as a defense lawyer for alleged Watergate conspirator Robert Mardian. Shortly after Mardian's trial began, Bress became so ill from cancer that he was unable to continue working, and he was replaced by his assistant Tom Green.

He graduated from University of Virginia and Harvard Law School.

Further reading
Rochvarg, Arnold (1995), Watergate Victory:  Mardian's Appeal, Lanham, MD:  University Press of America.   .

References

1908 births
1976 deaths
United States Attorneys for the District of Columbia
20th-century American lawyers
University of Virginia alumni
Harvard Law School alumni